Jan Huet (19 May 1903 – 2 April 1976) was a Belgian stained glass painter. 

Huet studied Greek and Latin at the Minor Seminary in Hoogstraten and then went to the Higher Institute of Art Crafts in Ixelles and the Sint-Lucas School and the Higher Institute in Sint-Gillis Brussels.
After his education he went to Denmark to realize some works there. In 1947 he became a professor at the Royal Academy of Fine Arts of Antwerp.

His cousin  was also a glass painter.

References

1903 births
1976 deaths
Belgian stained glass artists and manufacturers
People from Hoogstraten